Glaucias (also Glaukos (Γλαῦκος) or Glaucus) was the physician who attended Hephaestion during his final illness and was executed on Alexander's orders.

References
Who's Who in the Age of Alexander the Great by Waldemar Heckel 

Physicians of Alexander the Great
4th-century BC Greek physicians